Umar Cheema is an investigative reporter for the Pakistani newspaper The News. In 2008, he won a Daniel Pearl Journalism Fellowship, becoming the first Pearl fellow to work at The New York Times. He also attended London School of Economics as a Chevening Scholar (Chevening Scholarship) doing M.Sc. in Comparative Politics (Conflict studies).

Kidnapping
On September 4, 2010, he was abducted, beaten, flogged and sexually assaulted by a group of assailants. They also shaved his head, eyebrows, and mustache. Cheema reported that his attackers asked him if he was trying to discredit the government with his reporting, leading him to believe that they were from Pakistan's Inter-Services Intelligence agency.

Aftermath
Following the incident, The New York Times issued an editorial calling on the Pakistani government to find out who abducted Mr. Cheema and bring them to justice." The Committee to Protect Journalists echoed the call, describing the attack as "a message sent to all journalists in Pakistan" that must be answered. For his brave journalism and willingness to publicly speak about the attack at risk of his own life, the CPJ awarded Cheema its 2011 International Press Freedom Award, "an annual recognition of courageous journalism". In his acceptance speech, Cheema thanked the group for its "recognition of the bold work Pakistani media is doing". On 14 April 2011, Cheema also received the Tully Center Free Speech Award of Syracuse University.

Cheema is the father of a son and a daughter. Adil, his son, was two years old when Cheema was abducted.

See also
List of kidnappings
List of solved missing person cases

References

2010s missing person cases
Alumni of the London School of Economics
Enforced disappearances in Pakistan
Formerly missing people
Living people
Kidnapped people
Missing person cases in Pakistan
Pakistani investigative journalists
Pakistani male journalists
Year of birth missing (living people)